José Manuel Colmenero Crespo (born 29 November 1973), known as José Manuel, is a Spanish former professional footballer who played as a right midfielder.

Club career
José Manuel was born in Gijón, Asturias. A product of hometown's Sporting de Gijón youth academy, he was not very successful in his first stint with the club (only 12 first-team appearances over his first three seasons) but, after a loan spell with RCD Mallorca in Segunda División in the 1996–97 campaign, with promotion, he returned as a full member of the main squad, but Sporting were relegated from La Liga in his first year back.

Having attracted attention from Deportivo de La Coruña in 1999 and subsequently purchased for €300.000, José Manuel would then begin a series of loan spells in the first and second divisions, adding to this a very short experience with Germany's Hannover 96 in the Bundesliga (also on loan, alongside compatriots – in the same situation – Fernando and Jaime).

Finally released in June 2003, he resumed his career mainly in the Segunda División B, retiring well into his 30s. During this timeframe he played mainly for CD Roquetas, in the third tier but also in Tercera División.

References

External links

1973 births
Living people
Footballers from Gijón
Spanish footballers
Association football midfielders
La Liga players
Segunda División players
Segunda División B players
Tercera División players
Sporting de Gijón B players
Sporting de Gijón players
RCD Mallorca players
Deportivo de La Coruña players
SD Compostela footballers
CD Numancia players
Polideportivo Ejido footballers
Elche CF players
Pontevedra CF footballers
Marbella FC players
CD Roquetas footballers
Marino de Luanco footballers
Bundesliga players
Hannover 96 players
Spanish expatriate footballers
Expatriate footballers in Germany
Spanish expatriate sportspeople in Germany